The Salabro River is a river of Minas Gerais and Goiás states in central Brazil.

See also
List of rivers of Goiás
List of rivers of Minas Gerais

References
Brazilian Ministry of Transport

Rivers of Goiás
Rivers of Minas Gerais